Kunza is an extinct language isolate once spoken in the Atacama Desert of northern Chile and southern Peru by the Atacama people, who have since shifted to Spanish. The last speaker was documented in 1949.

Other names and spellings include Cunza, Likanantaí, Lipe, Ulipe, and Atacameño.

History
The language was spoken in northern Chile and southern Peru, specifically in the Chilean villages of Peine, Socaire (near the Salar de Atacama), and Caspana.

The last Kunza speaker was found in 1949, although some have been found since according to anthropologists. There are 2,000 Atacameños (W. Adelaar).

Unattested varieties listed by Loukotka (1968):
Atacameño of Bolivia - spoken in a small village on the frontier of Potosí Department, Bolivia, and Antofagasta Province of Chile
Lipe (Olipe) - extinct language once spoken south of the Salar de Uyuni, Potosí Department, Bolivia

Classification

Kaufman (1990) found a proposed connection between Kunza and the likewise unclassified Kapixaná to be plausible; however, the language was more fully described in 2004, and the general consensus among linguists was that both languages are isolates.

Language contact
Jolkesky (2016) notes that there are lexical similarities with the Mochika, Kandoshi, Jaqi, Kechua, Mapudungun, and Uru-Chipaya language families due to contact.

Phonology

See also
Macro-Paesan languages

References

External links
Kunza Swadesh vocabulary list (from Wiktionary's Swadesh list appendix)
Spanish-Kunza dictionary online
 Bibliography about Kunza
Alain Fabre, 2005, Diccionario etnolingüístico y guía bibliográfica de los pueblos indígenas sudamericanos: KUNZA
Kunza (Intercontinental Dictionary Series)

Indigenous languages of the Andes
Atacama Desert
Languages of Chile
Extinct languages of South America
Languages extinct in the 1950s
Language isolates of South America
Macro-Paesan languages